Soest is a municipality and a town in the central Netherlands, in the province of Utrecht.

Population centres

The town of Soest 
The oldest documents mentioning Soest (then written as Zoys) date from 1029. Its oldest church (the Oude Kerk, meaning Old Church), which is still in use today, dates from the fifteenth century. Traces of earlier habitation are found though. The area of "Hees", now at the outskirts of Soest may date in to the Early Middle Ages, and prehistoric burial mounds in the Soesterduinen point to early habitation in this area.

Agricultural activity is still visible as there is much farmland within Soest. The biggest area is in the center of the town, on a hill, and are called 'de Engh'. A small street is het Kerkpad (literally, the Church Path). The Soesterduinen (sand dunes), is a popular area for recreation.

Numerous churches depict the Calvinist/Catholic tradition of Soest and the region. Christengemeente Soest, Wilhelmina Kerk Soest, Gereformeerde Kerk Vrijgemaakt, Emmakerk and the Evangelische Kerk Soest are the main churches.

Soest Duinen, meaning Soest Dunes, a small town between Soest and Soesterberg contains acres upon acres of sand dunes named the Lange Duinen (meaning the long dunes). 

Currently some 50,000 inhabitants live in Soest, consisting mainly of commuters.

Transport 
Soest has three railway stations:

Soestdijk
Soest
Soest Zuid

The biggest of the three is Soest Zuid.

Soest can be reached by train from Utrecht (every half-hour, xx:06 and xx:36) and Baarn (xx:22 and xx:52); all trains stop at the three stations. The station of
Soestduinen, situated between Utrecht Centraal and Amersfoort Centraal, was closed in 1998, after being in use for 135 years. It is now a restaurant.

The stations that can be reached directly from Soest are:
Baarn
Den Dolder
Bilthoven
Utrecht Overvecht
Utrecht Centraal

Soest has a number of bus stops and three bus lines, all of which leave from the bus station at Soest Zuid exactly at the half-hour. Line 70 however, travel both directions to Amersfoort and Hilversum. Line 74 travels within the town of Soest. And multiple others travel through Soest. (272 Bunschoten-Spakenburg to Uithof, Utrecht vv. More info found at 9292ov.nl for all the public transport connections

Notable people 

 Gerard Soest (ca. 1600 – 1681) portrait painter who was active in England
 Johannes Andreas Schmitz (1621–1652) a Dutch physician
 Prince Alexander of the Netherlands (1818–1848) second son to King William II and Queen Anna Paulovna
 Dirk Jan de Geer (1870–1960) politician, Prime Minister of the Netherlands 1926-1929 and 1939-1940 
 Frida Vogels (born 1930) writer, lives in Bologna 
 Ed van den Heuvel (born 1940) astronomer
 Marlous Fluitsma (born 1946) actress 
 Peter Kooy (born 1954) bass singer specializing in baroque music
 Jack Wouterse (born 1957) actor 
 Thomas von der Dunk (born 1961) cultural historian, writer and columnist
 Janine Jansen (born 1978) a violinist and violist
 Mirik Milan (born 1981) former Amsterdam Night Mayor

Sport 
 Robert Roest (born 1969) footballer
 Jolanda Elshof (born 1975) retired female volleyball player
 Bianca van den Hoek (born 1976) professional racing cyclist
 Richard van Zijtveld (born 1979) former darts player
 Daniël Stellwagen (born 1987) chess grandmaster 
 Daan Huizing (born 1990) professional golfer

Sport 
There are four football clubs in Soest: SEC, VV Hees, SO Soest and VVZ '49. Soesterberg has its own football club, VV 't Vliegdorp.

Twin towns – sister cities

Soest is twinned with:
 Soest, Germany, since 2004

Gallery

See also
Patientia Vincit Omnia

References

External links

Official Website

 
Municipalities of Utrecht (province)
Populated places in Utrecht (province)